The 2014–15 Denver Nuggets season was the franchise's 39th season in the National Basketball Association (NBA).

Preseason

Draft picks

Regular season

Standings

Game log

|- style="background:#cfc;"
| 1
| October 29
| Detroit
| 
| Kenneth Faried (22)
| Kenneth Faried (17)
| Ty Lawson (5)
| Pepsi Center17,136
| 1–0

|- style="background:#fcc;"
| 2
| November 1
| @ Oklahoma City
| 
| Ty Lawson (25)
| Wilson Chandler (7)
| Ty Lawson (5)
| Chesapeake Energy Arena18,203
| 1–1
|- style="background:#fcc;"
| 3
| November 3
| Sacramento
| 
| Arron Afflalo (16)
| Kenneth Faried (10)
| Ty Lawson (12)
| Pepsi Center12,516
| 1–2
|- style="background:#fcc;"
| 4
| November 5
| @ Sacramento
| 
| Randy Foye (19)
| K. Faried & J. Nurkić (5)
| Ty Lawson (9)
| Sleep Train Arena14,539
| 1–3
|- style="background:#fcc;"
| 5
| November 7
| Cleveland
| 
| Randy Foye (28)
| Wilson Chandler (10)
| Randy Foye (9)
| Pepsi Center19,623
| 1–4
|- style="background:#fcc;"
| 6
| November 9
| @ Portland
| 
| Kenneth Faried (19)
| Timofey Mozgov (16)
| Ty Lawson (8)
| Moda Center19,411
| 1–5
|- style="background:#fcc;"
| 7
| November 12
| Portland
| 
| Ty Lawson (32)
| J.J. Hickson (11)
| Ty Lawson (6)
| Pepsi Center12,611
| 1–6
|- style="background:#cfc;"
| 8
| November 14
| @ Indiana
| 
| Arron Afflalo (17)
| K. Faried & T. Mozgov (6)
| Ty Lawson (10)
| Bankers Life Fieldhouse16,286
| 2–6
|- style="background:#fcc;"
| 9
| November 16
| @ New York
| 
| Arron Afflalo (18)
| Kenneth Faried (9)
| Ty Lawson (9)
| Madison Square Garden19,812
| 2–7
|- style="background:#cfc;"
| 10
| November 17
| @ Cleveland
| 
| Ty Lawson (24)
| D. Arthur & T. Mozgov (11)
| Ty Lawson (12)
| Quicken Loans Arena20,562
| 3–7
|- style="background:#cfc;"
| 11
| November 19
| Oklahoma City
| 
| Wilson Chandler (21)
| Kenneth Faried (10)
| Ty Lawson (15)
| Pepsi Center14,140
| 4–7
|- style="background:#cfc;"
| 12
| November 21
| New Orleans
| 
| K. Faried & A. Afflalo (19)
| K. Faried & J. McGee (8)
| Ty Lawson (15)
| Pepsi Center15,232
| 5–7
|- style="background:#cfc;"
| 13
| November 23
| @ LA Lakers
| 
| Wilson Chandler (19)
| Timofey Mozgov (13)
| Ty Lawson (16)
| Staples Center18,997
| 6–7
|- style="background:#cfc;"
| 14
| November 25
| Chicago
| 
| Ty Lawson (20)
| K. Faried & T. Mozgov (9)
| Ty Lawson (12)
| Pepsi Center17,033
| 7–7
|- style="background:#fcc;"
| 15
| November 26
| @ Phoenix
| 
| Wilson Chandler (19)
| Timofey Mozgov (13)
| Ty Lawson (12)
| Talking Stick Resort Arena16,099
| 7–8
|- style="background:#cfc;"
| 16
| November 28
| Phoenix
| 
| Arron Afflalo (22)
| J.J. Hickson (11)
| Ty Lawson (10)
| Pepsi Center15,509
| 8–8

|- style="background:#cfc;"
| 17
| December 1
| @ Utah
| 
| T. Lawson & W. Chandler (15)
| Timofey Mozgov (10)
| Ty Lawson (12)
| EnergySolutions Arena16,768
| 9–8
|- style="background:#fcc;"
| 18
| December 2
| Portland
| 
| Ty Lawson (24)
| Wilson Chandler (10)
| Ty Lawson (13)
| Pepsi Center12,822
| 9–9
|- style="background:#fcc;"
| 19
| December 5
| @ Washington
| 
| Wilson Chandler (20)
| J.J. Hickson & T. Mozgov (6)
| Ty Lawson (10)
| Verizon Center19,451
| 9–10
|- style="background:#fcc;"
| 20
| December 7
| @ Atlanta
| 
| Wilson Chandler (29)
| Timofey Mozgov (11)
| Ty Lawson (10) 
| Philips Arena12,143
| 9–11
|- style="background:#fcc;"
| 21
| December 8
| @ Toronto
| 
| Arron Afflalo (25)
| Darrell Arthur (13)
| Ty Lawson (10)
| Air Canada Centre19,800
| 9–12
|- style="background:#cfc;"
| 22
| December 10
| Miami
| 
| Wilson Chandler (17)
| Timofey Mozgov (10)
| Ty Lawson (9)
| Pepsi Center13,433
| 10–12
|- style="background:#fcc;"
| 23
| December 13
| @ Houston
| 
| Darrell Arthur (20)
| J.J. Hickson (10)
| Ty Lawson (12)
| Toyota Center18,136
| 10–13
|- style="background:#fcc;"
| 24
| December 14
| San Antonio
| 
| Arron Afflalo (31)
| Timofey Mozgov (13)
| Ty Lawson (10) 
| Pepsi Center16,544
| 10–14
|- style="background:#fcc;"
| 25
| December 17
| Houston
| 
| Wilson Chandler (23)
| Kenneth Faried (11)
| Ty Lawson (16)
| Pepsi Center12,107
| 10–15
|- style="background:#cfc;"
| 26
| December 19
| LA Clippers
| 
| Nate Robinson (20)
| Timofey Mozgov (8)
| Ty Lawson (14) 
| Pepsi Center15,030
| 11–15
|- style="background:#cfc;"
| 27
| December 20
| Indiana
| 
| Danilo Gallinari (19)
| Timofey Mozgov (15)
| Ty Lawson (10)
| Pepsi Center14,125
| 12–15
|- style="background:#fcc;"
| 28
| December 22
| @ Charlotte
| 
| Ty Lawson (18)
| Kenneth Faried (9)
| Ty Lawson (4) 
| Time Warner Cable Arena16,913
| 12-16
|- style="background:#fcc;"
| 29
| December 23
| @ Brooklyn
| 
| Ty Lawson (29)
| Kenneth Faried (14)
| Ty Lawson (9)
| Barclays Center17,080
| 12-17
|- style="background:#cfc;"
| 30
| December 26
| Minnesota
| 
| Kenneth Faried (26)
| Kenneth Faried (25)
| Ty Lawson (11)
| Pepsi Center14,516
| 13–17
|- style="background:#fcc;"
| 31
| December 28
| Toronto
| 
| Ty Lawson (25)
| Kenneth Faried (16)
| Ty Lawson (7)
| Pepsi Center14,216
| 13–18
|- style="background:#fcc;"
| 32
| December 30
| LA Lakers
| 
| T. Lawson & J. Nurkic (16)
| T. Mozgov & J. Nurkic (8)
| Ty Lawson (9)
| Pepsi Center17,248
| 13–19

|- style="background:#fcc;"
| 33
| January 1
| @ Chicago
| 
| Wilson Chandler (22)
| Kenneth Faried (19)
| Ty Lawson (7)
| United Center21,794
| 13–20
|- style="background:#cfc;"
| 34
| January 3
| Memphis
| 
| Ty Lawson (25)
| Kenneth Faried (13)
| Ty Lawson (11) 
| Pepsi Center16,350
| 14–20
|- style="background:#cfc;"
| 35
| January 5
| @ Minnesota
| 
| Arron Afflalo (34)
| J.J. Hickson (11)
| Ty Lawson (12)
| Target Center10,386
| 15–20
|- style="background:#cfc;"
| 36
| January 7
| Orlando
| 
| Ty Lawson (23)
| Kenneth Faried (12)
| Nate Robinson (7)
| Pepsi Center13,513
| 16–20
|- style="background:#cfc;"
| 37
| January 9
| @ Sacramento
| 
| T. Lawson & A. Afflalo (22)
| Kenneth Faried (13)
| Ty Lawson (8)
| Sleep Train Arena16,029
| 17–20
|- style="background:#cfc;"
| 38
| January 14
| Dallas
| 
| Ty Lawson (29)
| Kenneth Faried (14)
| Ty Lawson (12)
| Pepsi Center14,022
| 18–20
|- style="background:#fcc;"
| 39
| January 16
| @ Dallas
| 
| Arron Afflalo (16)
| J.J. Hickson (14)
| Ty Lawson (12)
| American Airlines Center20,337
| 18–21
|- style="background:#fcc;"
| 40
| January 17
| Minnesota
| 
| Ty Lawson (22)
| J.J. Hickson (10)
| Ty Lawson (7)
| Pepsi Center14,821
| 18–22
|- style="background:#fcc;"
| 41
| January 19
| @ Golden State
| 
| Ty Lawson (19)
| Kenneth Faried (9)
| Ty Lawson (6)
| Oracle Arena19,596
| 18–23
|- style="background:#fcc;"
| 42
| January 20
| San Antonio
| 
| Kenneth Faried (26)
| Kenneth Faried (14)
| Ty Lawson (8)
| Pepsi Center14,434
| 18–24
|- style="background:#fcc;"
| 43
| January 23
| Boston
| 
| Jameer Nelson (23)
| Kenneth Faried (14)
| Jameer Nelson (7)
| Pepsi Center16,133
| 18–25
|- style="background:#fcc;"
| 44
| January 25
| Washington
| 
| Ty Lawson (31)
| Kenneth Faried (11)
| Ty Lawson (12) 
| Pepsi Center15,410
| 18–26
|- style="background:#fcc;"
| 45
| January 26
| @ L.A. Clippers
| 
| Ty Lawson (31)
| K. Faried & W. Chandler (10)
| Ty Lawson (12)
| Staples Center19,060
| 18–27
|- style="background:#cfc;"
| 46
| January 28
| @ New Orleans
| 
| Arron Afflalo (20)
| Jusuf Nurkic (9)
| Ty Lawson (12)
| Smoothie King Center16,055
| 19–27
|- style="background:#fcc;"
| 47
| January 29
| @ Memphis
| 
| K. Faried & W. Chandler (10)
| Kenneth Faried (7)
| Ty Lawson (6)
| FedExForum16,736
| 19–28
|- style="background:#fcc;"
| 48
| January 31
| Charlotte
| 
| Danilo Gallinari (15)
| J.J. Hickson & W. Chandler (8)
| Ty Lawson (9)
| Pepsi Center13,302
| 19–29

|- style="background:#fcc;"
| 49
| February 3
| @ Philadelphia
| 
| Danilo Gallinari (15)
| Ty Lawson & W. Chandler (6)
| Ty Lawson (14) 
| Wells Fargo Center10,290
| 19–30
|- style="background:#fcc;"
| 50
| February 4
| @ Boston
| 
| Ty Lawson (23)
| Kenneth Faried (11)
| Ty Lawson (8)
| TD Garden15,126
| 19–31
|- style="background:#fcc;"
| 51
| February 6
| @ Detroit
| 
| Ty Lawson (20)
| Jusuf Nurkic (13)
| Ty Lawson (9)
| The Palace of Auburn Hills17,035
| 19–32
|- style="background:#fcc;"
| 52
| February 9
| Oklahoma City
| 
| Wilson Chandler (23)
| Jusuf Nurkic (14)
| Ty Lawson (9)
| Pepsi Center16,511
| 19–33
|- style="background:#cfc;"
| 53
| February 10
| @ L.A. Lakers
| 
| Ty Lawson (32)
| J.J. Hickson (7)
| Ty Lawson (16)
| STAPLES Center18,466
| 20–33
|- align="center"
|colspan="9" bgcolor="#bbcaff"|All-Star Break
|- style="background:#fcc;"
| 54
| February 20
| @ Milwaukee
| 
| Wilson Chandler (19)
| Jusuf Nurkic (15)
| Ty Lawson (7)
| BMO Harris Bradley Center16,110
| 20–34
|- style="background:#fcc;"
| 55
| February 22
| @ Oklahoma City
| 
| Ty Lawson (17)
| J. Nurkic &  K. Faried (7)
| Jameer Nelson (5)
| Chesapeake Energy Arena18,203
| 20–35
|- style="background:#fcc;"
| 56
| February 23
| Brooklyn
| 
| Danilo Gallinari (22)
| Jusuf Nurkic (10)
| Ty Lawson (10)
| Pepsi Center13,127
| 20–36
|- style="background:#fcc;"
| 57
| February 25
| Phoenix
| 
| Will Barton (22)
| Joffrey Lauvergne (9)
| Ty Lawson (7)
| Pepsi Center12,813
| 20–37
|- style="background:#fcc;"
| 58
| February 27
| Utah
| 
| Will Barton (22)
| K. Faried & W. Chandler (8)
| Ty Lawson (6) 
| Pepsi Center15,002
| 20–38

|- style="background:#fcc;"
| 59
| March 1
| New Orleans
| 
| Danilo Gallinari (21)
| J.J. Hickson & Will Barton (10)
| Ty Lawson (11)
| Pepsi Center13,109
| 20–39
|- style="background:#cfc;"
| 60
| March 3
| Milwaukee
| 
| Danilo Gallinari (26)
| Kenneth Faried (14)
| Ty Lawson (10)
| Pepsi Center12,234
| 21–39
|- style="background:#cfc;"
| 61
| March 4
| @ Minnesota
| 
| Will Barton (17)
| Kenneth Faried (14)
| Ty Lawson & Jameer Nelson (9)
| Target Center13,848
| 22–39
|- style="background:#fcc;"
| 62
| March 6
| @ San Antonio
| 
| Ty Lawson (23)
| Kenneth Faried (10)
| Ty Lawson (9) 
| AT&T Center18,581
| 22–40
|- style="background:#fcc;"
| 63
| March 7
| Houston
| 
| Wilson Chandler (26)
| J.J. Hickson (10)
| Ty Lawson (10)
| Pepsi Center15,231
| 22–41
|- style="background:#cfc;"
| 64
| March 9
| New York
| 
| Kenneth Faried (19)
| Kenneth Faried (11)
| Ty Lawson (6)
| Pepsi Center14,153
| 23–41
|- style="background:#cfc;"
| 65
| March 11
| Atlanta
| 
| Danilo Gallinari (23)
| J.J. Hickson (9)
| Ty Lawson (9)
| Pepsi Center13,217
| 24–41
|- style="background:#cfc;"
| 66
| March 13
| Golden State
| 
| Danilo Gallinari & Kenneth Faried (24)
| Kenneth Faried (17)
| Randy Foye (8)
| Pepsi Center19,155
| 25–41
|- style="background:#cfc;"
| 67
| March 15
| @ New Orleans
| 
| Will Barton (25)
| Kenneth Faried (10)
| Ty Lawson (9)
| Smoothie King Center17,248
| 26–41
|- style="background:#fcc;"
| 68
| March 16
| @ Memphis
| 
| Jameer Nelson (24)
| Wilson Chandler (8)
| Will Barton (4)
| FedExForum17,248
| 26–42
|- style="background:#fcc;"
| 69
| March 19
| @ Houston
| 
| Danilo Gallinari & Randy Foye (23)
| Kenneth Faried (12)
| Ty Lawson (10) 
| Toyota Center18,456
| 26–43
|- style="background:#fcc;"
| 70
| March 20
| @ Miami
| 
| Kenneth Faried (20)
| J. Nurkic &  W. Chandler (7)
| Ty Lawson (12)
| AmericanAirlines Arena19,710
| 26–44
|- style="background:#cfc;"
| 71
| March 22
| @ Orlando
| 
| Danilo Gallinari (40)
| J.J. Hickson (8)
| Ty Lawson (8)
| Amway Center15,788
| 27–44
|- style="background:#fcc;"
| 72
| March 25
| Philadelphia
| 
| Ty Lawson (19)
| Wilson Chandler (11)
| Ty Lawson (6)
| Pepsi Center14,068
| 27–45
|- style="background:#cfc;"
| 73
| March 27
| Utah
| 
| Ty Lawson & Jameer Nelson (18)
| Will Barton (10)
| Ty Lawson (9)
| Pepsi Center15,312
| 28–45
|- style="background:#fcc;"
| 74
| March 28
| @ Portland
| 
| Jameer Nelson (22)
| Kenneth Faried (10)
| Ty Lawson (7)
| Moda Center19,769
| 28–46

|- style="background:#fcc;"
| 75
| April 1
| @ Utah
| 
| Kenneth Faried (19)
| Kenneth Faried (10)
| Ty Lawson (3)
| EnergySolutions Arena18,275
| 28–47
|- style="background:#fcc;"
| 76
| April 3
| @ San Antonio
| 
| Danilo Gallinari (20)
| Jusuf Nurkic (9)
| Ty Lawson (7)
| AT&T Center18,581
| 28–48
|- style="background:#fcc;"
| 77
| April 4
| L.A. Clippers
| 
| Wilson Chandler (17)
| Kenneth Faried (14)
| Randy Foye (5)
| Pepsi Center15,566
| 28–49
|- style="background:#cfc;"
| 78
| April 8
| L.A. Lakers
| 
| Kenneth Faried (29)
| Kenneth Faried (11)
| Ty Lawson (8)
| Pepsi Center13,338
| 29–49
|- style="background:#fcc;"
| 79
| April 10
| Dallas
| 
| Danilo Gallinari (47)
| Wilson Chandler (11)
| Ty Lawson (18)
| Pepsi Center14,041
| 29–50
|- style="background:#cfc;"
| 80
| April 12
| Sacramento
| 
| Kenneth Faried (30)
| Jusuf Nurkic & Wilson Chandler (9)
| Ty Lawson (11)
| Pepsi Center14,004
| 30–50
|- style="background:#fcc;"
| 81
| April 13
| @ L.A. Clippers
| 
| Wilson Chandler (32)
| Kenneth Faried (17)
| Randy Foye (8)
| Staples Center19,060
| 30–51
|- style="background:#fcc;"
| 82
| April 15
| @ Golden State
| 
| Wilson Chandler & Danilo Gallinari (18)
| Jusuf Nurkic (9)
| Ty Lawson (8)
| Oracle Arena19,596
| 30–52

Player statistics

Regular season

|- align="center" bgcolor=""
| 
| 53 || 53 || 33.0 || .428 || .337 || .841 || 3.4 || 1.9 || .6 || .1 || 14.5
|- align="center" bgcolor=""
| 
| 58 || 4 || 17.0 || .404 || .236 || .780 || 2.9 || 1.0 || .8 || .4 || 6.6
|- align="center" bgcolor=""
| 
| 28 || 0 || 24.4 || .443 || .284 || .810 || 4.6 || 1.9 || style=|1.2 || .5 || 11.0
|- align="center" bgcolor=""
| 
| 7 || 0 || 4.4 || .364 || .200 || style=|1.000 || .4 || .3 || .4 || .1 || 1.9
|- align="center" bgcolor=""
| 
| style=|78 || style=|75 || 31.7 || .429 || .342 || .775 || 6.1 || 1.7 || .7 || .4 || 13.9
|- align="center" bgcolor=""
| 
| 75 || 71 || 27.8 || .507 || .125 || .691 || style=|8.9 || 1.2 || .8 || .8 || 12.6
|- align="center" bgcolor=""
| 
| 3 || 0 || 4.3 || .500 || style=|.500 || .000 || .7 || 1.0 || .00 || .3 || 1.0
|- align="center" bgcolor=""
| 
| 50 || 21 || 21.7 || .368 || .357 || .818 || 1.7 || 2.4 || .7 || .2 || 8.7
|- align="center" bgcolor=""
| 
| 59 || 27 || 24.2 || .401 || .355 || .895 || 3.7 || 1.4 || .8 || .3 || 12.4
|- align="center" bgcolor=""
| 
| 39 || 0 || 13.1 || .482 || .417 || .738 || 1.8 || .5 || .7 || .2 || 4.9
|- align="center" bgcolor=""
| 
| 43 || 1 || 9.5 || .377 || .298 || .833 || .7 || .9 || .3 || .00 || 3.4
|- align="center" bgcolor=""
| 
| 55 || 6 || 13.1 || .304 || .204 || .745 || 1.2 || .5 || .7 || .1 || 3.4
|- align="center" bgcolor=""
| 
| 73 || 8 || 19.3 || .475 || .000 || .577 || 6.2 || .8 || .5 || .5 || 7.6
|- align="center" bgcolor=""
| 
| 24 || 1 || 11.2 || .404 || .188 || .643 || 3.2 || .5 || .3 || .4 || 3.9
|- align="center" bgcolor=""
| 
| 75 || style=|75 || style=|35.5 || .436 || .341 || .730 || 3.1 ||style=|9.6 || style=|1.2 || .1 ||style=|15.2
|- align="center" bgcolor=""
| 
| 27 || 17 || 11.5 || style=|.557 || .000 || .690 || 2.8 || .1 || .1 || 1.1 || 5.2
|- align="center" bgcolor=""
| 
| 35 || 35 || 25.6 || .504 || .333 || .733 || 7.8 || .5 || .4 || style=|1.2 || 8.5
|- align="center" bgcolor=""
| 
| 34 || 5 || 20.6 || .450 || .354 || .579 || 1.9 || 3.7 || .7 || .1 || 9.6
|- align="center" bgcolor=""
| 
| 62 || 27 || 17.8 || .446 || .000 || .636 || 6.2 || .8 || .8 || 1.1 || 6.9
|- align="center" bgcolor=""
| 
| 33 || 1 || 14.1 || .348 || .261 || .650 || 1.2 || 2.3 || .4 || .1 || 5.8
|}

 Statistics with the Denver Nuggets.

Injuries

Roster

Transactions

Trades

Free agents

Signings

Subtractions

Awards

References

External links
 2014–15 Denver Nuggets preseason at ESPN
 2014–15 Denver Nuggets regular season at ESPN

Denver Nuggets seasons
Denver
Denver Nuggets
Denver Nuggets